Savage U is an American talk show series on MTV. The series debuted on April 3, 2012.

Premise
The series follows Dan Savage and Lauren Hutchinson as they travel to different colleges across the United States. In each episode, there is an open Q&A session where Savage and Hutchinson discuss anonymous questions submitted by the audience. Within the episodes, Savage has a one-on-one session with various students who have issues that encase deeper relationship problems.

Episodes

References

External links
 
 

2010s American television talk shows
2012 American television series debuts
English-language television shows
MTV original programming
Dan Savage